Listen to Me is a 1989 American drama film written and directed by Douglas Day Stewart. Released on May 5, 1989, it stars Kirk Cameron, Jami Gertz, and Roy Scheider.  The film was largely shot on location in Malibu, California, including the campus of Pepperdine University.

Plot summary
Listen to Me centers around a group of college students who are members of the debate team at fictional Kenmont College. The two main characters, Tucker Muldowney (Kirk Cameron) and Monica Tomanski (Jami Gertz), come from underprivileged backgrounds and have won scholarships to Kenmont for displaying exceptional talent for debating. Both students are taken under the wing of the debate-team coach, Charlie Nichols (Scheider), who was a star debater in his youth.

The team eventually wins a chance to debate the issue of abortion against Harvard in front of the Supreme Court. Along the way, the students learn lessons about life, love, friendship, and politics.

The film also includes the theme song "Listen to Me", which was written and produced by David Foster and Linda Thompson and recorded by Celine Dion and Warren Wiebe, sometime in 1988.

Cast

Main

Supporting

Cameo/Uncredited

Production
The film was originally called Mismatch and was meant to star James Garner but he had heart surgery and was replaced by Roy Scheider. Filming started in May 1988.

The film was re-titled Talking Back when released on video in the US.

"It's kind of the flipside of Less than Zero," said associate producer Chuck Cooperman. "These people are our future leaders. They're just as bright, concerned and just as passionate as anyone."

It was financed by the Weintraub Entertainment Group from Jerry Weintraub.

Kirk Cameron said it "was easy for me to relate to" his character. "To begin with, it's a dramatic part. It's not a film about teenagers with half a brain running around drinking, dancing and partying. The characters are intelligent and responsible. They are genuinely concerned about the world we live in. It's much closer to reality than other teen pictures. It's time to show the other side of my generation, the deeper side."

Reception
The film's marketing was going to focus on Kirk Cameron, then at the height of his popularity. However Jerry Weintraub over-rode them and insisted on ads that emphasized the fact the film dealt with a debate about abortion, hoping to stir up controversy. The movie was a flop at the box office. "Fans were neither angered or disturbed, they simply stayed away," wrote the Wall Street Journal.

Film historian Leonard Maltin gave the picture 1.5 (out of a possible 4) stars: "After 9 years, the star and screenwriter of The Blue Lagoon reunite for this slick travesty...set on the kind of party campus where Dick Dale and the Del-Tones wouldn't be out of place. The climactic abortion debate is cheap and hokey in roughly equal measure; Kirk Cameron's shifty Oklahoma accent certainly doesn't help. See The Great Debaters instead."

Awards and nominations

References

External links
 
 
 
 
Listen to Me at Fast Rewind
Review of film at New York Times
Review of film at Washington Post
Review of film at Chicago Tribune
Listen to Me at Los Angeles Times

1989 films
American drama films
1989 drama films
Debating
Films directed by Douglas Day Stewart
Films scored by David Foster
Films with screenplays by Douglas Day Stewart
Columbia Pictures films
Weintraub Entertainment Group films
1980s English-language films
Golden Raspberry Award winning films
1980s American films